Studio B Productions, Inc. (sometimes known as just Studio B and later known as DHX Media Vancouver) was a Canadian animation studio and production company founded by Blair Peters and Chris Bartleman in Vancouver, British Columbia, in 1988. The studio was acquired by DHX Media on December 4, 2007, and became a subsidiary there since then. The Studio B brand is permanently discontinued, and from 2010 to 2019, all shows were branded using the DHX Media name. Since 2019, all shows are now branded under the WildBrain name.

History 

The company was founded in 1988 by Blair Peters and Chris Bartleman. On December 4, 2007, DHX Media acquired Studio B. On September 8, 2010, the renaming of the studio after its parent company, along with DHX Media's other subsidiaries, was announced: officially, on December 22, 2010, Studio B Productions Inc. and Studio B (Animation Service) Productions Inc. were renamed DHX Media (Vancouver) Ltd. and DHX Media Studio (Vancouver) Ltd., respectively, and on January 11, 2011, Studio B Holdings Inc. was renamed DHX Media (Vancouver Prod) Ltd.

In 2016, the former Studio B team was relocated to a new facility in Vancouver. The new building also houses the former Nerd Corps Entertainment, an animation studio which DHX Media acquired in 2014.

Filmography

Television series

Films and specials

References

External links 
 

Canadian animation studios
Companies based in Vancouver
WildBrain
Mass media companies established in 1988
Mass media companies disestablished in 2016
1988 establishments in British Columbia
2016 disestablishments in British Columbia
2007 mergers and acquisitions